(+)-Camphor 6-exo-hydroxylase ((+)-camphor 6-hydroxylase) is an enzyme with systematic name (+)-camphor,NADPH:oxygen oxidoreductase (6-exo-hydroxylating). This enzyme catalyses the following chemical reaction

 (+)-camphor + NADPH + H+ + O2  (+)-6-exo-hydroxycamphor + NADP+ + H2O

(+)-Camphor 6-exo-hydroxylase is a cytochrome P-450 monooxygenase isolated from Salvia officinalis.

References

External links 
 

EC 1.14.13